Guillaume Gillet (born 9 March 1984) is a Belgian professional footballer who plays as a midfielder or defender for Anderlecht.

Club career

Born in Liège, Gillet has played for RFC Liège, Visé, Eupen, Gent, Anderlecht and SC Bastia who Gillet joined on a season-long loan deal with on 10 July 2014. On 1 November Gillet scored a costly own goal as Bastia lost 1–0 at home to Guingamp.

On December 2015, while at Anderlecht, Gillet said he had turned down an offer from LA Galaxy but that he could still move to Major League Soccer that winter. He was out of contract at the end of the season. Eventually on 28 December 2015  has joined FC Nantes from Jupiler League champions Anderlecht.

On 7 August 2017, Gillet signed a two-year contract with Olympiacos, thereby re-uniting with his former manager at Anderlecht, Besnik Hasi. On 18 November 2017, he scored his first goal with the club opening the score in a 2–1 home Greek Super League game against Levadiakos. He left Olympiakos at the end of the 2017–18 season.

On 2 August 2018, Gillet signed a two-year contract with French Ligue 2 club RC Lens. After his second season with Lens, during which he helped the club achieve promotion to Ligue 1, his contract was not renewed.

In July 2020, Gillet returned to Belgium having agreed a one-year contract with Sporting Charleroi.

On 12 January 2022, Gillet joined Waasland-Beveren in the second-tier Belgian First Division B until the end of the 2021–22 season.

In May 2022 he returned to Anderlecht, to play with their under-23 team.

International career
Gillet made his international debut for Belgium in 2007, and has appeared in FIFA World Cup qualifying matches for his country, scoring the equalising goal in the 45th minute in a 1–1 draw with Croatia.

International goals

Honours
Anderlecht
 Belgian Cup: 2007–08
 Belgian Super Cup: 2010, 2012, 2013
 Belgian Pro League: 2009–10, 2011–12, 2012–13, 2013–14

References

External links
 
 

1984 births
Living people
Footballers from Liège
Association football fullbacks
Association football defenders
Belgian footballers
Walloon sportspeople
Belgium under-21 international footballers
Belgium international footballers
Belgian Pro League players
Challenger Pro League players
Ligue 1 players
Ligue 2 players
Super League Greece players
K.A.A. Gent players
R.S.C. Anderlecht players
K.A.S. Eupen players
C.S. Visé players
SC Bastia players
RFC Liège players
FC Nantes players
Olympiacos F.C. players
RC Lens players
R. Charleroi S.C. players
S.K. Beveren players
Belgian expatriate footballers
Expatriate footballers in France
Belgian expatriate sportspeople in France
Expatriate footballers in Greece
Belgian expatriate sportspeople in Greece